Black Thunder is a water theme park in Tamil Nadu, India. The park offers about 49 rides, Surf Hill and the Wild River Ride notable among them. The park has a hotel on its premises.

References 

Tourist attractions in Coimbatore
Amusement parks in Tamil Nadu
Buildings and structures in Coimbatore
2000 establishments in Tamil Nadu
Water parks in India
Amusement parks opened in 2000

Entry ticket adult 790/ child 690